Talisa Torretti, born 25 January 2003 in Fabriano, Italy) is an Italian individual rhythmic gymnast. She is the 2018 European Junior Ribbon bronze medalist. She is the 2018 Youth Olympic Games individual all-around bronze medalist.

Career

Junior
She first appeared in Italian National team in 2017, when she was a member of a junior group which competed at the 2017 Junior European Championships in Budapest, Hungary and won silver medal in 10 Clubs final. A year later, she returned to individual competition and represented Italy at the 2018 Junior European Championships in Guadalajara, Spain. She and her teammates Eva Swahili Gherardi and Sofia Raffaeli took 4th place in Team competition. Talisa also qualified to two Apparatus finals, taking 6th place with Hoop and winning bronze medal with Ribbon. As the most successful Italian junior that year, she was selected to represent Italy at the 2018 Youth Olympic Games in Buenos Aires, Argentina. She placed second after Russian Daria Trubnikova in Individual Qualifications and then took bronze medal in Individual Final, after Ukrainian Khrystyna Pohranychna. She also won gold medal in Mixed Team competition.

Senior
In 2019, she started competing in Senior category. She competed at the 2019 Italian National Championships and took 5th place in All-around. She also qualified to Hoop final and finished on 6th place. In 2020, she started competing as a member of the Italian National reserve group.

Routine music information

References

Living people
2003 births
Gymnasts at the 2018 Summer Youth Olympics
Medalists at the Rhythmic Gymnastics European Championships